"All of You" is a popular song written by Cole Porter and published in 1954.

It was introduced by Don Ameche in the Broadway musical Silk Stockings and featured in the film version as well, when it was sung by Fred Astaire.

Notable recordings

 Ahmad Jamal – for the album Ahmad Jamal Plays (1955)
 Kenny Burrell – for the album Kenny Burrell (1957)
 Anita O'Day - included on her album Anita O'Day Swings Cole Porter with Billy May (1959)
 Annie Ross – for her album Annie Ross Sings a Song with Mulligan! (1959)
 Bill Evans – featured the song on his live 1961 album Sunday at the Village Vanguard
 Billie Holiday - on the album Last Recording (1959)
 Bobby Darin (1963) - included on the compilation album The Swinging Side of Bobby Darin (2005).
 Denny Zeitlin - on his album Wishing on the Moon (2018)
 Ella Fitzgerald - on her album Ella Fitzgerald Sings the Cole Porter Song Book (1956)
 Karrin Allyson - on her album Collage (1996)
 Frank Sinatra - on Trilogy: Past Present Future (1980).
 Harry Connick Jr - on True Love: A Celebration of Cole Porter (2019).
 Mel Tormé - for his album Musical Sounds Are the Best Songs (1956).
 Michael Holliday - included on the album Hi! (1958).
 Miles Davis - on 'Round About Midnight (1957).
 Modern Jazz Quartet - on the 1955 album Concorde.
 McCoy Tyner - on Live at Newport (1963).
 Nancy Wilson - for her album Like in Love (1960)
 Robert Goulet - on the album Two of Us (1962).
 Sammy Davis Jr. - a single release in 1956.
 Sarah Vaughan - for the album After Hours at the London House (1958)
 Tony Bennett - included as a bonus track on the CD reissue of When Lights Are Low (1964). Recorded again for Steppin' Out (1993)
 Tony Martin  - a single release in 1957.
 Vrock - a single released on his YouTube Channel in 2022 featuring JJ Ironberg, which covers the Frank Sinatra rendition.

References

1954 songs
Songs from Cole Porter musicals
Songs written by Cole Porter
Nancy Wilson (jazz singer) songs
Fred Astaire songs